John Brocas (1741-1795) was an Anglican priest in Ireland during the 18th century.

Brocas was born in County Dublin; and educated at Trinity College, Dublin. He was Dean of Killala from 1741 until his death.

Notes

Alumni of Trinity College Dublin
18th-century Irish Anglican priests
Deans of Killala
Christian clergy from Dublin (city)
1741 births
1795 deaths